William Gillies (15 September 1914 – 17 December 1986) was a Scottish sports shooter. He competed at the 1960 Summer Olympics and the 1964 Summer Olympics representing Hong Kong.

References

1914 births
1986 deaths
Hong Kong male sport shooters
Olympic shooters of Hong Kong
Shooters at the 1960 Summer Olympics
Shooters at the 1964 Summer Olympics
Place of birth missing
Scottish male sport shooters
British male sport shooters